Kaarlo Heikki Tuori (born 9 April 1948) is a Finnish legal scholar.

He was born in Helsinki. After taking his doctorate in jurisprudence in 1983, he eventually became professor of jurisprudence at the University of Helsinki. His main works are Oikeuden rationalisuus (1988), Oikeus, valta ja demokratia (1990) and Critical Legal Positivism (2002, originally Kriittinen oikeuspositivismi, 2000). He is a member of the Norwegian Academy of Science and Letters.

References

1948 births
Living people
Finnish legal scholars
Academic staff of the University of Helsinki
Members of the Norwegian Academy of Science and Letters